The Commencement Bay-class escort aircraft carriers were the last class of escort carriers built for the US Navy in World War II.

The ships were based on the Maritime Commission type T3 Tanker hull, which gave them a displacement of approximately 23,000 tons and a length of 557 feet (170 m).  Unlike most earlier escort carrier classes, which were laid down as something else and converted to aircraft carriers mid-construction, the Commencement Bays were built as carriers from the keel up.  Their general layout was similar to the s, but some of the Sangamon's engineering shortcomings were addressed.

They entered service late in World War II –  launched on 9 May 1944 – so most of them saw little or no operational service. Thirty-five of them were ordered but many were cancelled prior to completion.  Nineteen saw commissioned service in the US Navy, four were broken up on the ways at the end of the war, two were accepted from the builders but never commissioned, and the remainder were cancelled before being laid down.

After the war they were seen as potential helicopter, anti-submarine, or auxiliary (transport) carriers, and a number of ships served in these roles during the Korean War.  The oncoming Jet Age ended their careers, as the ships were no longer large enough to safely carry the much larger jet aircraft of the late 1950s, and all units were out of service or reclassified by 1960.

Ships 

All of the Commencement Bay-class escort carriers that were laid down were built by the Seattle-Tacoma Shipbuilding Corporation (a.k.a. Todd Pacific Shipyards) in the Commencement Bay, Tacoma, Washington yard, in addition to the planned (but unnamed) ships CVE-128 through CVE-131. Planned (but unnamed) ships CVE-132 through CVE-139 were to be built by Kaiser Shipbuilding Company, in Vancouver, Washington, but were never laid down.

See also

List of ship classes of the Second World War

External links

 USS Commencement Bay Class Escort Carriers from Global Security.Org
 USS Commencement Bay Class from Battleships-Cruisers.co.uk

Escort aircraft carrier classes
 Commencement Bay class escort carrier
 Commencement Bay class escort carrier
 Commencement Bay class escort carrier
 Commencement Bay class escort carrier
 Commencement Bay class escort carrier